Jinsei×Boku= (人生×僕= Jinsei Kakete Boku wa, lit. Life Times Me Equals) is the sixth studio album by the Japanese rock band, One Ok Rock. It was released on March 6, 2013 and reached first place on the Oricon weekly chart. This album brought ONE OK ROCK to worldwide popularity, especially after the first single, "The Beginning", was selected as official soundtrack in the live action adaptation of Rurouni Kenshin. The song peaked at #2 on the Billboard Japan Hot 100 and stayed for 45 weeks. The next single, "Deeper Deeper/Nothing Helps", was featured on the DmC: Devil May Cry ("Nothing Helps") game and used for Suzuki Swift TV commercials ("Deeper Deeper").

A DVD special bundled with the album released for limited pre-order only, consist of an acoustic performance in the studio of "The Beginning" and "The Same As...".

The song "The Beginning" can be heard in the 2012 film Rurouni Kenshin. "Clock Strikes" was featured in the PS3/PS4 Sega game Ryū ga Gotoku Ishin!. The song "Be The Light" was used in the animated film Space Pirate Captain Harlock, starring Shun Oguri and Haruma Miura.

Background and development 
After their first two nights live in Yokohama Arena, One Ok Rock stated that they "wanted to begin recording a new album." Songs like "The Beginning" and "Clock Strikes", had been made long before Zankyo Reference was released.
In mid-2012, they were asked to make a song for a new live adaption of the popular manga Rurouni Kenshin. The single "The Beginning" was used for the live adaption movie.

Promotion 
One Ok Rock held their first national arena tour in 2013, engaged more than 100,000 audiences, six cities and 11 days, started from 11 May to 6 June 2013. They recorded 22 songs from their second day in Yokohama Arena and insert them into Blu-ray and DVD, entitled Jinsei×Kimi= (人生×君=) Tour Live&Film, together with the one-hour documentation of this tour.
Later the band conducted their first world tour, consisted in 11 countries of Asia and Europe from October to December. An additional date added for Los Angeles and New York in early 2015. In the spring of 2014, they participated in Vans Warped Tour, successfully reaching new audiences abroad.

Accolades

Track listing 

Notes
 There are seven kinds of music videos uploaded on the band's Official YouTube including English subtitles, Japanese subtitles, French subtitles, Chinese subtitles, Spanish subtitles, Portuguese subtitles, and no subtitles. The contents are the same in all versions.
 The song was made for their friend, Kei Goto (also known as K), vocalist of Pay Money To My Pain who died in the morning of December 30, 2012 due to acute heart failure.
 Pronounced rokku (ロック, "Rock"), the track's name is an answer to the album title: "Life Times Me Equals Rock". The song title is a goroawase.

Personnel
Credits adapted from the liner notes of Jinsei×Boku=.

One Ok Rock
 Takahiro "Taka" Moriuchi — lead vocals
 Toru Yamashita — guitar
 Ryota Kohama — bass guitar
 Tomoya Kanki — drums

Additional musicians
 Makoto Minagawa — piano (4, 6, 9, 10)
 Kiyohide Ura — piano (13)
 Mio Okamura — 1st violin (2)
 Shohei Yoshida — 2nd violin (2)
 Mikiyo Kikuchi — viola (2)
 Robin Dupuy — cello (2)
 Yoshinobu Takeshita — contrabass (2}
 Ayano Kasahara — cello (9)
 Mari Masumoto — cello (9)
Design
 Kazuaki Seki — art direction
 Daichi Shiono — design

Production
 Akkin — programming (1), strings arrangement (2, 9) 
 Kenichi Arai — recording, engineering
 Tomoki Kagami — recording, engineering
 John Feldmann — mixing (1–3, 5, 7, 8, 10–12)
 Tommy English — mixing (1–3, 5, 7, 8, 10–12)
 Tue Madsen — mixing (4, 9, 13)
 Chris Lord-Alge — mixing (6)
 Ryota Hattanda — assistant 
 Yusuke Watanabe — assistant 
 Yuji Nakamura — assistant 
 Kimihiro Nakase —  assistant
 Naoki Iwata — assistant 
 Ted Jensen — mastering 
 Kazutaka Minemori — guitar and bass technician
 Yoshiro "Masuo" Arimatsu — drum technician
 Jamil — English translations

Charts

Weekly charts

Year-end charts

Singles

Certifications

References

External links 
 
 One Ok Rock discography 

2013 albums
One Ok Rock albums
A-Sketch albums
Alternative rock albums by Japanese artists